is a former Japanese football player and the currently goalkeeper coach J1 League club of Albirex Niigata.

Playing career
Ishizue was born in Itami on July 22, 1964. After graduating from Tokai University, he joined All Nippon Airways (later Yokohama Flügels) in 1987. His played more and more, and he became a regular goalkeeper during the 1989–90 season. However, during the 1990–91 season, he played less often than newcomer Masanori Sanada. In 1992, although Sanada left the club, he still not play as much as Atsuhiko Mori. In 1993, the club won the championship in the Emperor's Cup, their first major title. He played in the Final, and that was his only match that season. In 1995, he moved to his local club, Vissel Kobe, in the Japan Football League. He played as a regular goalkeeper and the club was promoted to the J1 League in 1997. In 1998, his did not play as much as Nobuhiro Maeda and he retired at the end of the 1998 season.

Club statistics

References

External links

1964 births
Living people
Tokai University alumni
Association football people from Hyōgo Prefecture
Japanese footballers
Japan Soccer League players
J1 League players
Japan Football League (1992–1998) players
Yokohama Flügels players
Vissel Kobe players
Association football goalkeepers